The Hanover Tavern in Hanover Courthouse, Virginia, is located in Hanover County and is one of the oldest taverns in the United States.

History
The first tavern at this site was licensed in 1733. Hanover Tavern has been serving county courthouse users, residents, travelers, and stagecoach passengers ever since. Court would convene once every month, with judges and patrons travelling long distances to conduct business. Travelers needed an inn to provide meeting space, food, drink, and overnight stays as well as stables and food for their teams, horses, and mules.

The Hanover County Courthouse is still an operating courthouse, the third oldest in use in the United States. Located along what is now historic U.S. Route 301, its site was adjacent to the original Shelton Tavern. Hanover County's greatest native son, Founding Father Patrick Henry, married Sarah Shelton, the daughter of John and Eleanor Parks Shelton, the owners of the Tavern from 1750–1764. Henry assisted his father-in-law by greeting and serving guests, tending bar, and entertaining with his fiddle playing. Working at the tavern exposed Henry to the legal world and in April 1760 at the age of 24, he obtained a license to practice law.

Patrick Henry's oratory skills and patriotic fervor were first recognized on December 1, 1763, when he delivered an impassioned speech during the damages phase of the Parson's Cause case. Across the street at Hanover Courthouse, he was the first to publicly challenge the authority of the King and question the true motives of the clergy representing the Church of England. This was one of the first signs of the revolutionary spirit growing in America.

During the Revolutionary War, French officers Marquis de Lafayette, Marquis de Chastellux, and Rochambeau all enjoyed the hospitality of Tavern owner Paul Thilman. Chastellux referred to the tavern as a "Tolerable handsome inn, with a large salon and covered portico." In his diary, General George Washington twice refers to dining and lodging at Hanover Courthouse.

The Civil War turned the Tavern into a home for refugees fleeing the Union Army. Two such boarders were Margaret Wight and her husband John. While living at the Tavern, Margaret kept a diary, reporting on such things as news of the war, worries about her children, occurrences at the Tavern, and the price of food and clothing. In the opening paragraph of the diary, Margaret refers to the war as "this most unhappy contest, which is now at its height, between the two sections of our once happy country".

In 1800, seven slaves from Hanover Tavern took part in the planning of a failed slave insurrection known as Gabriel's Rebellion. Over the years, celebrated guests such as Chief Justice John Marshall, Edgar Allan Poe, P. T. Barnum, Charles Dickens, Union General Fitz John Porter, and Confederate generals J.E.B. Stuart and Wade Hampton visited this roadside fixture on the corridor between Richmond and Fredericksburg.

The present tavern building, restored by the Hanover Tavern Foundation, dates from 1791 with early 19th century and late 20th century additions and is listed on the Virginia Landmarks Register and the National Register of Historic Places. The original 1733 tavern building, having fallen into disrepair, was torn down after the construction of the 1822 section. By 1953, the tavern building was well-worn and possibly on its last legs. A group of young actors from New York bought the building and 3.5 acres with the intention of starting a dinner theater. They repaired the building to operate as their home and business, actually beginning the preservation of the old structure. The tavern was adapted as the first dinner theatre in America; Barksdale Theatre. It was the first performing arts organization in Virginia to seat integrated audiences. Barksdale Theatre merged with Theatre IV in 2012 to become Virginia Repertory Theatre.  Virginia Repertory Theatre still performs regularly at the Tavern, with dining options provided by the Hanover Tavern Restaurant & Pub, open for lunch and dinner Tuesday through Sunday.

In 1990, the non-profit Hanover Tavern Foundation bought the Tavern and 3.5 acres from the Barksdale Theatre owners and began to raise the needed money to stabilize and restore the aging building. The Foundation's goal was to restore, preserve and utilize the Tavern as an historical, educational, community and cultural resource center for the general public. The Foundation raised over $5 million, stabilizing and restoring the historic building, added a wing for restrooms, a restaurant quality kitchen, new mechanical systems, and refurbished the theater. After successful fundraising campaigns and completion of the restoration, the building reopened to the public in 2005.

The Tavern has been a vibrant center of community life at Hanover Courthouse for almost three hundred years. 

Today, this cultural site offers student field trips, educational history programs, historical exhibits, heritage musical events, lecture series, and family-oriented special events like Hanover AutumnFest & 5K as well as a full-service restaurant and pub, meeting, wedding, party, and events space, and Virginia Repertory Theatre performances in a modern 150-seat theater.

References

External links
 Official site
 Hanover AutumnFest & 5K
 Barksdale Theater history

Buildings and structures in Hanover County, Virginia
Tourist attractions in Hanover County, Virginia
Taverns in Virginia
Commercial buildings completed in 1791
Historic district contributing properties in Virginia
Patrick Henry
National Register of Historic Places in Hanover County, Virginia
Drinking establishments on the National Register of Historic Places in Virginia
Hotel buildings on the National Register of Historic Places in Virginia
1791 establishments in Virginia